Samuel Dana Greene, Sr. (February 11, 1839 – December 11, 1884) was an officer in the United States Navy during the American Civil War, mostly noted for his service aboard the  during the Battle of Hampton Roads.

Biography

Early life and career
Greene was born in Cumberland, Maryland, the son of future U.S. Army General George S. Greene. He entered the United States Naval Academy on September 21, 1855, and graduated on June 9, 1859, with the rank of midshipman. He was stationed on the steam sloop , which transported John Elliott Ward, the American ambassador to various cities in China to settle American claims.

Civil War
When the Civil War broke out, the Hartford was ordered to return home. Greene, having been promoted to lieutenant on August 31, 1861, arrived in Philadelphia on December 2, 1861. After a short leave, he volunteered for duty on the Monitor. Greene was appointed executive officer, serving under Commander Lieutenant John L. Worden during its historic four-hour battle at Hampton Roads, Virginia, with the Confederate ironclad warship  on March 9, 1862. During the battle he assumed full command of Monitor when Worden was temporarily blinded by shell fragments from an explosion from one of Virginias broadsides. After the subsequent retreat and assessment of all damage Greene ordered the return to battle and continued engaging the Virginia to a standoff. Greene continued to command the Monitor until Thomas O. Selfridge, Jr. took command on March 10, 1862.

From April to May 1862 Greene continued to serve as executive officer on Monitor during the Battle of Drewry's Bluff on the James River, Virginia, and later provided naval support for General McClellan's forces on land along that river. Greene was aboard the ship when it foundered in a gale 20 miles off Cape Hatteras on December 31 – January 1, 1863, which Greene survived after being pulled into a lifeboat by the ship's surgeon, Dr. Grenville M. Weeks.

In 1863 Greene served aboard the gunboat  on the blockade of North Carolina, then in 1864–1865 aboard the sloop , under the command of Christopher R. P. Rodgers, sailing around South America and across the Pacific to Singapore in search of the Confederate raider .

Post-war career
Greene was promoted to Lieutenant Commander on August 11, 1865, and served as instructor of mathematics at the Naval Academy from 1866 to 1868. He served as the head of the department of astronomy, navigation and surveying at the Naval Academy from 1871 to 1875, receiving promotion to Commander on December 12, 1872.

Greene was serving as the executive officer of the Portsmouth Navy Yard when on December 11, 1884 at the age of 45, he committed suicide at Portsmouth, New Hampshire, and was buried in the Juniper Hill Cemetery in Bristol, Rhode Island.

Personal life
Greene was married twice.  First to Mary Willis Dearth (1839-1874) and second to Mary Abby Babbitt (1839-1926).   Mary Abby Babbitt was the daughter of Major Jacob Babbitt (1809-1862) of the 7th Rhode Island Volunteer Infantry, who was killed in action at the Battle of Fredericksburg.

Greene had three children by his first wife - Samuel Dana Greene, Jr. (1864-1900), who graduated from the United States Naval Academy in 1883, Mary Richmond (Greene) Conover (1867-?) and Charles de Boketon Greene (1871-?).

Namesake
The destroyer  (1919–1945) was named for him.

See also

Union Navy

References

Bibliography

External links
 
 
 
 

American educators
1839 births
1884 deaths
Union Navy officers
United States Navy officers
Military personnel from Cumberland, Maryland
Suicides in New Hampshire
United States Naval Academy alumni
American expatriates in China
Greene family of Rhode Island
Burials at Juniper Hill Cemetery